Mission to Magnus is a story originally written to be part of the unfilmed 1986 season of Doctor Who.   It was novelised by its scriptwriter Philip Martin, who had previously written the television stories Vengeance on Varos and Mindwarp.

The story is set after another unfilmed story, The Nightmare Fair.

A novelisation of the story was published by Target Books in 1990 as the third volume of its Missing Episodes series.  A Big Finish audio adaptation of the story was published in 2009.

Synopsis
The Doctor is tricked by his old Gallifreyan school bully Anzor and becomes involved with a conflict on the planet Magnus. There, a virus in the planet's atmosphere has made the surface lethal to men, and the predominantly female society is led by Madamme Rana Zandusia. She believes that their neighboring planet Salvak has found a cure to the virus and will use it to invade and take over their planet. At the urging of Sil, who seeks commercial opportunity from any outcome of this conflict, Rana called for a Time Lord envoy, Anzor, to allow them to use time travel, prevent Salvak from developing the antidote, and save their planet. Recognising that the women of Magnus have powerful telepathic abilities that could allow them to discover the secrets of time travel, the Doctor tricks Anzor to depart in his TARDIS, allowing himself and Peri to handle the situation. Separately, the Doctor and Peri learn from a group of boys, part of Magnus' breeding program and led by Vion, that there is a prophecy of a revelation that will change Magnus' society for the better, heralded by the Doctor's arrival.

The Doctor is forced to show Rana and Sil how to use his TARDIS when they hold Peri hostage, but limits their travel to only a few hours ahead. Left behind, the Doctor, Peri, and Vion discover that a large number of Ice Warriors have been hiding under Magnus' ice caps, and have planted nuclear explosives around the planet aimed to push it out of orbit and farther away from its sun as to make its overall climate hospitable to the Ice Warriors, despite the loss of life on the surface. They encounter the survivors of an exploration team from Salvak that had come to offer the cure to the virus out of compassion with no plans to invade, but instead were caught by the Ice Warriors. With their help, the Doctor and his allies attempt to stall the explosions, but are unable to do so, and the planet shifts out of orbit.

By this point, Rana and the others have arrived by the TARDIS and shocked by the devastation that has killed many thousands already. Sil shows his true colors as he had worked to help bring the Ice Warriors the needed explosives, but when he is refuted by the Ice Warriors' Grand Marshall, he re-aligns with the Doctor to help Magnus. They are able to set off a backup set of explosives at the right point to return Magnus to its original orbit; the Ice Warriors, unprepared for this, are caught in the higher temperatures and die. The virus in the atmosphere is found to have died out as a result of the orbit-shifting, and the group of Salvakians offer their planet's aide to help rebuild Magnus and show them what it is like to be a gender-balanced society again; Sil sees the business opportunity in this and plans to stay to help as well. The Doctor and Peri leave just as Anzor is able to make his way back, cursing the Doctor's name.

Background
It was announced in 1985 that Michael Grade, controller of BBC1, had cancelled a number of long-running programmes in order to help fund the launch of a new soap opera named EastEnders. Of the many programmes that were cancelled, Doctor Who was the most high-profile. A campaign was quickly launched by the national press to see about its return and Grade very quickly confirmed that Doctor Who would be returning in 1986.

Several stories had already been in the planning stages for the 23rd Season of Doctor Who, three of which were in the middle of being scripted when the announcement was made. Writer Philip Martin, who had seen mild success with his script for Vengeance on Varos the previous year, was asked by producer John Nathan-Turner to write a script containing the return of the popular Sil, introduced in that story. He also requested the inclusion of the Ice Warriors, who hadn't been seen in Doctor Who since The Monster of Peladon in 1974. As the third in production, this script was the least complete at the time of the cancellation, and no director had yet been announced (evidence suggests it might have been Ron Jones, who helmed both of Martin's other scripts for the series).

In 1988, Target Books, which had been successfully publishing novelisations of Doctor Who stories for many years, saw itself quickly running out of available televised material (although a number of serials remained unadapted, most of these were off-limits due to licensing problems). While negotiations went forward with the BBC for the publication of all new adventures, the decision was made to resurrect three of the cancelled scripts and publish them in book form. The writers of all three were approached, and all were signed on to write the novels.

Intended Transmission 
Mission to Magnus Part One was to be transmitted on 1 February 1986. Part Two was to have been broadcast on 8 February 1986.

Notes

As it was the least complete of the three scripts, Mission to Magnus required a great deal more work in adapting it to novel form. Martin would later recall that everything up to the point where Anzor vanishes from the story was more or less scripted, and the material that followed that had only been storylined at the point the series was rested. One thing that he took advantage of in the process of "finishing" the story in novel form was to include a reference to the Mentor Kiv, a character seen in this story's eventual replacement in the produced Season 23 The Trial of a Time Lord story, Mindwarp.

Audio adaptation

Mission to Magnus is a Big Finish Productions audio drama based on the long-running British science fiction television series Doctor Who.

In February 2009, Big Finish announced plans to track down and record seven of the cancelled serials from the original season 23 of Doctor Who. Mission to Magnus was the first of these to be recorded after being adapted by original author Philip Martin.

Cast
The Doctor – Colin Baker 
Peri – Nicola Bryant
Sil – Nabil Shaban
Anzor – Malcolm Rennie
Madamme Rana Zandusia – Maggie Steed
Jarmaya/Tace – Susan Franklyn
Ulema/Soma – Tina Jones
Vion – William Townsend
Asam – Callum Witney Mills
Brorg/Vedikael/Grand Marshal/Ishka – Nicholas Briggs
Skaarg/Jarga/Hussa – James George

Cast notes
This is the first time that Nabil Shaban or Sil have appeared in a Big Finish audio production.

References

External links
Big Finish Productions
Hidden Planet Lost Scripts site
The Cloister Library – Mission to Magnus

1990 British novels
1990 science fiction novels
2010 audio plays
Doctor Who serials novelised by Philip Martin
Sixth Doctor novels
Sixth Doctor audio plays
Novels set on fictional planets